The 1984–85 Toto Cup Artzit was the 1st season of the second tier League Cup (as a separate competition) since its introduction. 

It was held in two stages. First, the 16 Liga Artzit teams were divided into four groups. The group winners advanced to the semi-finals, which, as was the final, were held as one-legged matches. 

The competition was won by Hapoel Ashkelon, who had beaten Bnei Yehuda 2–0 in the final.

Group stage
The matches were played from 30 October 1984 to 6 April 1985.

Group A

Group B

Group C

Group D

Elimination rounds

Semifinals
{| class="wikitable" style="text-align: center; width:600px"
|-
!scope="col" width="240px" |Team 1
!scope="col" width="120px" |Score
!scope="col" width="240px" |Team 2
|-

Final

See also
 1984–85 Toto Cup Leumit

References

Artzit
Toto Cup Artzit
Toto Cup Artzit